Fatih Bozkurt (born 6 April 2000) is a Turkish Greco-Roman wrestler competing in the 130 kg division. He is a member of İstanbul Büyükşehir Belediyesi S.K.

Career 
Fatih Bozkurt captured bronze medal in men's Greco-Roman 130 kg at 2021 European U23 Wrestling Championships.

Fatih Bozkurt captured the silver medal in men's Greco-Roman 130 kg at 2022 European U23 Wrestling Championships.

References

External links
 

2000 births
Living people
Turkish male sport wrestlers
21st-century Turkish people